Myra Eila Matilda Kenttä Granberg (born October 1, 1975) is a Swedish singer-songwriter and producer. Her debut single "Tills mitt hjärta går under" peaked at number six on the Swedish singles chart and has been streamed 11 million times. In 2019, she signed with Sony Music. On 14 February, 2020, Granberg released the single "Äru min nu" and it peaked at number four on the Swedish Heatseekers Chart. On 15 May 2020, she released the single "Salt i såren", featuring Malin Christin. She is also known as Lvly, a name that she uses on Epidemic Sound for pop and electronic music in English.

On 16 April 2021, Granberg released "Lose My Mind", the first track from her upcoming debut studio album, which was scheduled for release on 10 September 2021.

Discography

Studio albums

EPs

Singles

As solo artist

As Lvly

As featured artist

Notes

References 

Living people
1994 births
People from Nybro Municipality
Sony Music artists
Swedish women singer-songwriters
Swedish singer-songwriters